Ditmar Jakobs (born 28 August 1953) is a German former footballer who played as a defender. He played as a centre-back, a classical libero in the mold of Franz Beckenbauer or Willi Schulz. 

Jakobs played 493 games from 1971 to 1990 for Rot-Weiß Oberhausen, Tennis Borussia Berlin, MSV Duisburg, and Hamburger SV. With Hamburger SV, he won the 1987 DFB-Pokal. In 1982 and 1983, he became German champion and in 1983, he won the European Cup.

Jakobs was a member of the Germany national team that was runner-up in the 1986 FIFA World Cup in Mexico. From 1980 to 1986, he collected 20 caps for the team.

Accident 
Jakobs' career ended prematurely on 20 September 1989 in a game between Hamburger SV and Werder Bremen. When an attacker lobbed the Hamburger SV goalie, Jakobs lunged feet-first into his goal and scraped the ball off the line. However, he fell into the hooks fixing the goal to the ground (at that time, the hooks were not stipulated to be under the earth). He hung there for 20 agonising minutes, the hook deeply embedded in his flesh. Finally, the team doctor cut the hooks from his back with a scalpel. With this, the nerves in his back were cut. Because of this horrible accident, he was forced to end his career. However, he regards himself lucky, as the hook missed his spinal cords by a mere two inches.

Today, Jakobs is an insurance broker in Norderstedt, near Hamburg.

References

External links 
 
 
 

1953 births
Living people
Sportspeople from Oberhausen
German footballers
Germany international footballers
Germany B international footballers
Association football defenders
1986 FIFA World Cup players
Rot-Weiß Oberhausen players
Tennis Borussia Berlin players
MSV Duisburg players
Hamburger SV players
Bundesliga players
2. Bundesliga players
Footballers from North Rhine-Westphalia
West German footballers